City of Granada Trophy (Trofeo Ciudad de Granada), historically known as Trofeo Granada, was founded by Granada CF in the summer of 1973 at a rate to remain at the gates to contest the next season's UEFA Cup. During his more than 30 editions were played at the Estadio de Los Cármenes since 1995, with the demolition of the stadium, the event was first played on the Nuevo Los Cármenes.

The first edition was a homer that brought the rivals: the CD Málaga, Peñarol and OFK Belgrade, the latter rising com trophy.

The edition XXXIII, disputed the August 15, 2009 was the first under the name "Trofeo Los Cármenes" which faced Granada CF against newly promoted to First Division Xerez CD with the result 0–1 for visitors with the only goal scored by Antoñito.

Played on August 18, 2010, the XXXIV edition, was a single match that pitted the Granada CF with Malaga CF First Division, and in it the home side took the trophy after the 1-0 goal by former Alex Geijo ex-malaguist.

The XXXV edition was a triangular tournament between Atlético, Beşiktaş and Granada.

Other names Trophy
Trofeo Granada
Trofeo Ciudad de la Alhambra
Trofeo Ciudad de Granada
Trofeo Granada Alhambra
Trofeo Los Cármenes
Trofeo Hoteles MA
Trofeo Diputación de Granada

Titles by year

Titles by club

References

External links 
RSSSF Trofeo Los Cármenes
Trofeo Granada en el blog del historiador José Luis Ramos Torres

See also
 Teresa Herrera Trophy
 Villa de Madrid trophy
 Ramón de Carranza Trophy
 Trofeo Costa del Sol
 Trofeo Colombino

Granada CF
1973 establishments in Spain